Witchekan Lake First Nation ( wîhcîkan sâkahikanihk, meaning: at the stinking Lake) is a Cree First Nation in Saskatchewan, Canada. Their reserves include:

 Witchekan Lake 117
 Witchekan Lake 117D

References

Cree
First Nations in Saskatchewan